Aleksei Andreyevich Berdnikov (born 30 March 1996) is a Russian football player. He plays for FC Neftekhimik Nizhnekamsk.

Club career
He made his professional debut in the Russian Professional Football League for FC Dynamo GTS Stavropol on 20 August 2014 in a game against FC Astrakhan. He made his Russian Football National League debut for FC Volgar Astrakhan on 16 September 2017 in a game against FC Orenburg.

References

External links
 
 

1996 births
Sportspeople from Stavropol
Living people
Russian footballers
Association football defenders
FC Dynamo Stavropol players
FC Mordovia Saransk players
FC Volgar Astrakhan players
FC Neftekhimik Nizhnekamsk players
Russian First League players
Russian Second League players